The Crooked River High Bridge is a steel arch bridge that spans the Crooked River gorge in Jefferson County, Oregon. The bridge was designed by Conde McCullough and was completed in 1926. Shortly after its completion, Oregon State Highway Division created the Peter Skene Ogden Park just to the south of the bridge.

The bridge was eventually unable to keep up with the growing traffic demands of US 97 (US 97), and was replaced by the wider Rex T. Barber Veterans Memorial Bridge in 2000. The old bridge is open to pedestrians.

See also

List of bridges documented by the Historic American Engineering Record in Oregon
List of bridges in the United States by height

References

External links
Oregon State Parks panoramic image

Open-spandrel deck arch bridges in the United States
Bridges completed in 1926
Road bridges in Oregon
Historic American Engineering Record in Oregon
Bridges by Conde McCullough
U.S. Route 97
Bridges of the United States Numbered Highway System
1926 establishments in Oregon
Steel bridges in the United States
Transportation buildings and structures in Jefferson County, Oregon